Wolf ticket is a literal translation of the Russian language phrase , a colloquial expression to denote a version of a document with restrictive clauses in comparison to the full document. Figuratively, the phrase remains in use in many of the countries of the former communist bloc, usually to denote any kind of document that negatively affects one's career.

Originally the phrase was used in Imperial Russia to denote a document issued instead of the internal passport to persons who were given a half-year postponement of katorga or exile for settling personal affairs. Later, it denoted a limited certificate for completion of studies. Unlike a regular diploma, it merely stated that the studies were completed, but the student was not allowed to take exams for reasons of poor study or improper behavior.

A wolf ticket was a serious impediment to one's career. Still later this phrase was applied to a document issued in place of an internal passport to persons released from imprisonment ("certificate of release"). Usually this kind of document restricted the rights of a citizen in terms of place of residence (the 101st kilometre rule), occupation, and so on.

See also 
 101st kilometre
 Blacklisting
 Lishenets
 Residential segregation

Russian words and phrases
Slang
Documents
Russian Empire
Soviet internal politics
Human rights